Conopsis is a genus of snakes in the family Colubridae. The genus is endemic to Mexico.

Species
Six species are recognized as being valid.
Conopsis acuta 
Conopsis amphisticha 
Conopsis biserialis 
Conopsis lineata 
Conopsis megalodon 
Conopsis nasus 

Nota bene: A binomial authority in parentheses indicates that the species was originally described in a genus other than Conopsis.

References

Further reading
Günther A (1858). Catalogue of the Colubrine Snakes in the Collection of the British Museum. London: Trustees of the British Museum. (Taylor and Francis, printers). xvi + 281 pp. (Conopsis, new genus, p. 6; Conopsis nasus, new species, pp. 6–7).

Conopsis
Snake genera
Taxa named by Albert Günther